Achard is a surname, and was a given name in the Middle Ages

As a surname, it may refer to:

 Albert Achard (1894–1972), French World War I flying ace
 Antoine Achard (1696–1772), Swiss Protestant minister
 Claude-François Achard (1751–1809), French physician
 Emile Achard (1860–1944), French physician 
 Franz Karl Achard (1753–1821), Prussian chemist
 Gilbert Achard-Picard (1918–1954), French bobsledder
 Guy Achard (born 1936), French Latinist
 Jean Achard (1807–1884), French painter
 Jean Achard (racing driver) (1918–1951), French race-car driver and journalist 
 Julien Alexandre Achard de Bonvouloir (1749–1783), secret French envoy to the American colonies
 Léon Achard (1831–1905), French tenor
 Louis Amédée Achard (1814–1875), French novelist
 Marcel Achard (1899–1974), French playwright
 Michel Jacques François Achard (1778–1865), French general
 Sophie Achard (born 1977), French statistical neuroscientist

As a given name, it may refer to:

 Achard of St. Victor (died 1172), French bishop
 Count Achard of Lecce, Norman count of Lecce